Franklin Falls is a waterfall on the South Fork of the Snoqualmie River in the U.S. state of Washington.

Franklin Falls may also refer to:

Franklin Falls Dam, US Army Corps of Engineers dam on the Pemigewasset River in New Hampshire
Franklin Falls Historic District, National Register of Historic Places-listed district in Franklin, New Hampshire
Franklin Falls Pond, on the Saranac River in the Adirondack Mountains, New York
Franklin Falls, New York, hamlet on the Saranac River in town of Franklin, Franklin County, New York

See also
Franklin (disambiguation)